The 2011 ICC Awards were held on 12 September 2011 in London, England. They were presented at a grand ceremony in association with the Federation of International Cricketers' Associations (FICA).
The ICC had been hosting ICC Awards since 2004, which were now into their eighth year. Previous events were held in London (2004), Sydney (2005), Mumbai (2006), Johannesburg (2007, 2009), Dubai (2008) and Bangalore (2010).
The ICC awards the Sir Garfield Sobers Trophy to the Cricketer of the Year, which is considered to be the most prestigious award in world cricket.

Selection Committee
Chaired by ICC Cricket Hall of Famer Clive Lloyd, the ICC Selection Committee was charged with two main tasks. Using their experience, knowledge and appreciation of the game, they selected the ICC World XI Teams and provided a long list of nominations to the 25 members of the voting academy to cast their votes in the individual player award categories.

Selection Committee members:

 Clive Lloyd (chairman)
 Zaheer Abbas
 Mike Gatting
 Paul Adams
 Danny Morrison

Award categories and winners

Cricketer of the Year

 Jonathan Trott

Test Player of the Year

 Alastair Cook

ODI Player of the Year

 Kumar Sangakkara

Twenty20 International Performance of the Year
 Tim Southee, for taking 5/18 with one maiden from his allotted four overs against Pakistan at Eden Park in Auckland on 26 December 2010

Emerging Player of the Year

 Devendra Bishoo

Associate Player of the Year
 Ryan ten Doeschate

Umpire of the Year

 Aleem Dar

Women's Cricketer of the Year

 Stafanie Taylor

Spirit of Cricket
 MS Dhoni, for recalling Ian Bell during the second Test match against England at Trent Bridge in Nottingham on 31 July 2011

LG People's Choice Award
 Kumar Sangakkara

ICC World XI Teams

ICC Test Team of the Year

Kumar Sangakkara was selected as both captain and wicket-keeper of the Test Team of the Year. Other players are:

 Alastair Cook
 Hashim Amla
 Jonathan Trott
 Sachin Tendulkar
 Kumar Sangakkara
 AB de Villiers
 Jacques Kallis
 Stuart Broad
 Graeme Swann
 Dale Steyn
 James Anderson
 Zaheer Khan (12th man)

ICC ODI Team of the Year

MS Dhoni was selected as both captain and wicket-keeper of the ODI Team of the Year for the second time. Other players are:

 Tillakaratne Dilshan
 Virender Sehwag
 Kumar Sangakkara
 AB de Villiers
 Shane Watson
 Yuvraj Singh
 MS Dhoni
 Graeme Swann
 Umar Gul
 Dale Steyn
 Zaheer Khan
 Lasith Malinga (12th man)

Short lists
The short lists for the 2011 LG ICC Awards were announced by the ICC on 26 August 2011. They are the following:

Cricketer of the Year
 Hashim Amla
 Alastair Cook
 Sachin Tendulkar
 Jonathan Trott

Test Player of the Year
 James Anderson
 Alastair Cook
 Jacques Kallis
 Jonathan Trott

ODI Player of the Year
 Hashim Amla
 Gautam Gambhir
 Kumar Sangakkara
 Shane Watson

Twenty20 International Performance of the Year
 Tim Bresnan
 JP Duminy
 Tim Southee
 Shane Watson

Emerging Player of the Year
 Azhar Ali
 Devendra Bishoo
 Darren Bravo
 Wahab Riaz

Associate Player of the Year
 Ryan ten Doeschate
 Hamid Hassan
 Kevin O'Brien
 Paul Stirling

Umpire of the Year
 Aleem Dar
 Steve Davis
 Ian Gould
 Simon Taufel

Women's Cricketer of the Year
 Charlotte Edwards
 Lydia Greenway
 Shelley Nitschke
 Stafanie Taylor

Spirit of Cricket
 MS Dhoni
 Jacques Kallis

LG People's Choice Award
 Hashim Amla
 MS Dhoni
 Chris Gayle
 Kumar Sangakkara
 Jonathan Trott

Nominations
The following are the nominations for the 2011 LG ICC Awards:

Cricketer of the Year
 Hashim Amla
 James Anderson
 Ian Bell
 Stuart Broad
 Alastair Cook
 Rahul Dravid
 Jacques Kallis
 Zaheer Khan
 Kumar Sangakkara
 Andrew Strauss
 Graeme Swann
 Sachin Tendulkar
 Chris Tremlett
 Jonathan Trott
 AB de Villiers
 Shane Watson

Test Player of the Year
 Hashim Amla
 James Anderson
 Ian Bell
 Stuart Broad
 Alastair Cook
 Rahul Dravid
 Jacques Kallis
 Zaheer Khan
 Misbah-ul-Haq
 Kevin Pietersen
 Ishant Sharma
 Harbhajan Singh
 Dale Steyn
 Graeme Swann
 Sachin Tendulkar
 Chris Tremlett
 Jonathan Trott
 AB de Villiers
 Shane Watson

ODI Player of the Year
 Hashim Amla
 Michael Clarke
 MS Dhoni
 Gautam Gambhir
 Mohammad Hafeez
 Mahela Jayawardene
 Zaheer Khan
 Virat Kohli
 Lasith Malinga
 Munaf Patel
 Saeed Ajmal
 Shakib Al Hasan
 Kumar Sangakkara
 Virender Sehwag
 Yuvraj Singh
 Tim Southee
 Dale Steyn
 Graeme Swann
 Jonathan Trott
 AB de Villiers
 Shane Watson

Twenty20 International Performance of the Year
 Tim Bresnan
 Chamu Chibhabha
 JP Duminy
 Shandre Fritz
 Graeme Smith
 Tim Southee
 Shane Watson

Emerging Player of the Year
 Adnan Akmal
 Azhar Ali
 Hamish Bennett
 Devendra Bishoo
 Darren Bravo
 Kirk Edwards
 Colin Ingram
 Abhinav Mukund
 Wahab Riaz
 Kane Williamson

Associate Player of the Year
 Saqib Ali
 Ashish Bagai
 George Dockrell
 Ryan ten Doeschate
 Hamid Hassan
 Nawroz Mangal
 John Mooney
 Kevin O'Brien
 Mohammad Shahzad
 Paul Stirling
 Andrew White
 Gary Wilson

Umpire of the Year
 Billy Bowden
 Aleem Dar
 Steve Davis
 Kumar Dharmasena
 Billy Doctrove
 Marais Erasmus
 Ian Gould
 Tony Hill
 Richard Kettleborough
 Asad Rauf
 Simon Taufel
 Rod Tucker

Women's Cricketer of the Year
 Cri-Zelda Brits
 Sarah Cady
 Jess Duffin
 Charlotte Edwards
 Shandre Fritz
 Jhulan Goswami
 Lydia Greenway
 Bismah Maroof
 Laura Marsh
 Sara McGlashan
 Anisa Mohammed
 Shelley Nitschke
 Leah Poulton
 Poonam Raut
 Stafanie Taylor

See also

 International Cricket Council
 ICC Awards
 Sir Garfield Sobers Trophy (Cricketer of the Year)
 ICC Test Player of the Year
 ICC ODI Player of the Year
 David Shepherd Trophy (Umpire of the Year)
 ICC Women's Cricketer of the Year
 ICC Test Team of the Year
 ICC ODI Team of the Year

References

External links
 Official ICC Awards Web Site

International Cricket Council awards and rankings
Crick
2011 in cricket